The 1933 Nice Grand Prix (officially the II Grand Prix de Nice) was a Grand Prix motor race held at Nice on Sunday, 6 August 1933.

Compared to the relatively small 1932 Nice Circuit Race the 1933 race was a serious Grand Prix with almost all the best known drivers of the time in competition. The street course followed the best known roads in the famous holiday resort, up and down the Promenade des Anglaise (with a 1.4 km straight allowing speeds up to 200 km/h to be reached), the Avenue Verdun, around the Place Masséna, Avenue des Phocéens and Quai des Etats Unis. In common with several other Grand Prix in 1933 the grid starting positions were decided according to practice times. Tazio Nuvolari had his third consecutive Grand Prix win.

Classification

Notes
Exact number of laps completed by retired drivers is not known for certain, values shown above are taken from available sources

References

Nice Grand Prix
Sport in Nice
20th century in Nice
Nice Grand Prix